Hemachandran is an Indian actor in the Tamil film industry. His films include Nanda Nanditha and Krishnaveni Panjaalai.

Career
Hemachandran was born on 23 September in Chennai, Tamil Nadu. Hemachandran did his schooling in Stanes Anglo Indian Higher Secondary School in Coonoor, before moving to study at Sree Sankara Bala Vidyalaya Higher Secondary School and Lady Andal Venkatasubba Rao Matriculation Higher Secondary School. He later completed his B.Sc. in DG Vaishnav College.

Hemachandran chose to pursue a career in films and began to undertake classes with stunt choreographers to prepare himself physically as an actor. He is also a trained dancer and a karate artist. Initially, he appeared in few Tamil films as the lead actor, notably featured in Nanda Nanditha, a Tamil remake of the Kannada film Nanda Loves Nanditha, but the film failed to create the same impact in Tamil and became a box office failure. The film began production as a bilingual with Hemachandran set to play the antagonist in the Telugu version.

Later, he acted in a Tamil romance film Krishnaveni Panjaalai co-starring alongside Nandhana. The film released to positive reviews with critics praising the chemistry of the lead cast. He then worked on a film titled Meen, which featured music by G. V. Prakash Kumar. The film was late put on hold as a result of budgetary restraints.

Filmography

References 

Indian male film actors
Living people
Tamil male actors
Male actors from Chennai
Year of birth missing (living people)